The Mark 46 torpedo is the backbone of the United States Navy's lightweight anti-submarine warfare torpedo inventory and is the NATO standard. These aerial torpedoes are designed to attack high-performance submarines. In 1989, an improvement program for the Mod 5 to the Mod 5A and Mod 5A(S) increased its shallow-water performance. The Mark 46 was initially developed as Research Torpedo Concept I (RETORC I), one of several weapons recommended for implementation by Project Nobska, a 1956 summer study on submarine warfare.

Design details
Mark 46, Mod 5
 Primary Function: Air and ship-launched lightweight torpedo
 Contractor: Alliant Techsystems
 Power Plant: Two-speed, reciprocating external combustion; Mono-propellant (Otto fuel II)
 Length:  tube launch configuration (from ship),  with ASROC rocket booster
 Weight:  (warshot configuration)
 Diameter: 
 Range: 
 Depth: > 
 Speed: > 
 Guidance System: Homing mode: Active or passive/active acoustic homing
 Launch/search mode: Snake or circle search
 Warhead:  of PBXN-103 high explosive (bulk charge)
 Date Deployed: 1967 (Mod 0); 1979 (Mod 5)

Yu-7 variant
The Chinese Yu-7 torpedo is said to be based on the Mk 46 Mod 2. The Chinese Navy used the Yu-7 ASW torpedo, deployed primarily on ships and ASW helicopters, but it started to be replaced by the Yu-11 in 2012.

Operators

See also
CAPTOR mine (a sea mine which incorporates a Mk 46 torpedo)
MU90 Impact torpedo
Mark 50 torpedo
Mark 54 MAKO Lightweight Torpedo
Stingray torpedo
Advanced Light Torpedo Shyena

References
Citations

External links
DiGiulian, Tony, Navweaps.com: USA Torpedoes
Unofficial U.S. Navy Site: MK-46 Torpedo
FAS: MK-46 Torpedo

Cold War anti-submarine weapons of the United States
Torpedoes of the United States
Torpedoes of the United Kingdom
Aerial torpedoes
Military equipment introduced in the 1960s